Richard Albert (born 26 July 1983 as Richard Albert Bretschneider) is a German composer and songwriter.

Early life and music
Richard Albert is a self taught musician, he studied computer sciences and communication sciences at the RWTH Aachen University from 2004 to 2010. He made his debut as a film composer for the short film Sachliche Romanze in 2007. With the web-series Hell's Kitty he started working for various production companies in the USA. Richard Albert works frequently with writer/director and musician Nicholas Tana. Richard mainly is active in the indie-horror genre. He lives and works in Wuppertal, Germany.

Feature films
 2016: Losing Touch
 2016: Sticky: A (Self) Love Story
 2016: The Last Night Inn 
 2018: Hell's Kitty
 2018: Hide in the Light
 2019: The Bone Box

Awards
 2009: European Talent Award (nominated)
 2011: Jerry Goldsmith Award, Film Music Festival Úbeda (nominated)
 2011: European Talent Award (nominated)
 2013: Jerry Goldsmith Award, Film Music Festival Úbeda (nominated)
 2016: The Marshall Hawkins Awards – Best Musical Score – Feature (nominated)
 2016: German Film Music Award, Category "New talent" (nominated)
 2018: American Tracks Music Award, Category "Best song for a film"
 2019: American Tracks Music Award, Category "Best film score" (semi-finalist)
 2019: Paris Art and Movie Awards, Category "Best Soundtrack Song" (nominated)
 2019: Jerry Goldsmith Award, Category "Best Soundtrack Song" (nominated)

References

External links
 
 Official website

1983 births
German film score composers
Musicians  from Wuppertal
Living people